Tanquecitos South Acres II is a census-designated place (CDP) in Webb County, Texas, United States. This was a new CDP formed from parts of the Laredo Ranchettes CDP prior to the 2010 census with a population of 50.

It is one of several colonias in the county.

Geography
Tanquecitos South Acres II is located at  (27.486961, -99.388178).

Education
Residents are in the United Independent School District. Zoned schools include: Freedom Elementary School, Raul Perales Middle School, and United South High School.

The designated community college for Webb County is Laredo Community College.

References

Census-designated places in Webb County, Texas
Census-designated places in Texas